Sajjad Ahmed can refer to:

 Sajjad Ahmed (cricketer, born 1932), a Pakistani cricketer
 Sajjad Ahmed (cricketer, born 1974), a Bangladeshi cricketer
 Sajjad Ahmed (cricketer, born 1980), a Pakistani cricketer